Aed Ua Dubhda King of Ui Fiachrach Muaidhe, died 983.

Aed was the son of Cellac, son of Dubda mac Connmhach, who was in turn a grandson of Donn Cothaid mac Cathail, king of Ui Fiachrach Muaidhe (died 772). He was the first person to bear the surname Dowd, though its use in that sense more strictly began with his sons, Mael Ruanaid Ua Dubhda (died 1005) and Gebennac Ua Dubhda (died 1005).

Aed is noted as lord, or king, of all Ui Fiachrach Muaidhe (north Connacht) upon his death in 983. All its subsequent kings and lords descended from him, as do the O'Dowd Chiefs of the Name. Descendants included James Vippler O'Dowd and Siobhan Dowd.

External links
 http://www.ucc.ie/celt/published/T100005B/

References

 The History of Mayo, Hubert T. Knox, p. 379, 1908.
 Araile do fhlathaibh Ua nDubhda/Some of the princes of Ui Dhubhda, pp. 676–681, Leabhar na nGenealach:The Great Book of Irish Genealogies, Dubhaltach Mac Fhirbhisigh (died 1671), eag. Nollaig Ó Muraíle, 2004–05, De Burca, Dublin.

Monarchs from County Mayo
10th-century Irish monarchs
983 deaths
Year of birth unknown